Anolis roquet, also called Martinique anole, Martinique's anole, or savannah anole, is a species of anole lizard. It is endemic to the island of Martinique, located in the Caribbean Lesser Antilles.

It varies in body size, shape, scalation, and coloration.  Its dorsal surface ranges from green to gray-green, brown, or gray brown, with some populations also having areas of blue-green color.  Its ventral and dewlap colors also vary.  Its markings include dark marbling, spots, and chevrons; and light markings including flank stripes.

It is unusual among anoles in having a voice; it can make a squeaking noise when it is caught.

The subspecies are:
 Anolis roquet roquet (Lacépède, 1788)
 Anolis roquet caracoli Lazell, 1972
 Anolis roquet majolgris Lazell, 1972
 Anolis roquet salinei Lazell, 1972
 Anolis roquet summus Lazell, 1972
 Anolis roquet zebrilus Lazell, 1972

The Barbados anole (A. extremus) was formerly included here as another subspecies.

References

External links
Anolis roquet at the Encyclopedia of Life
Anolis roquet at the Reptile Database
Contrasting dynamics in secondary contact zones of Anolis roquet in north-eastern Martinique

Anoles
Lizards of the Caribbean
Endemic fauna of Martinique
Reptiles described in 1788
Taxa named by Bernard Germain de Lacépède